Anthonius Jacobus Kuys (11 August 1903 – 14 March 1978) was a Dutch cyclist. He competed in the individual road race at the 1928 Summer Olympics.

See also
 List of Dutch Olympic cyclists

References

External links
 

1903 births
1978 deaths
Dutch male cyclists
Olympic cyclists of the Netherlands
Cyclists at the 1928 Summer Olympics
Cyclists from The Hague
20th-century Dutch people